Garett may refer to:
Garett Bolles (born 1992), American football player
Garett Maggart
Garette Ratliff Henson
 Garrett Weber-Gale (born 1985), swimmer, two-time Olympic gold medalist, world record-holder in two events

See also
 Garret
 Garrett